Alokdia is a village in Jhalokati District in the Barisal Division of southern-central Bangladesh.
It is also a village in Magura District in the Khulna Division

References

External links
Satellite map at Maplandia.com

Populated places in Jhalokati District